Nicholas David Jordan Faust (born February 25, 1993) is an American professional basketball player. He played college basketball for Maryland and Long Beach State before playing professionally in Israel, Italy, Hungary and Taiwan.

College career
He played three seasons for the University of Maryland. In his first season he was named to the All-Freshman Team of the Atlantic Coast Conference. He averaged 9.4 points, 3.7 rebounds and 2 assists per game as a junior and spent the latter half of the season as a bench player. In 2014 he transferred to Long Beach State after originally committing to Oregon State, and sat out a redshirt year per NCAA regulations. Faust played one more season, in which he averaged 17.4 points and 6.1 rebounds per game and led the 49ers to the NIT. Faust was chosen as the newcomer of the year of the Big West Conference and was named to the First Team All Big West.

Professional career

Ironi Nahariya (2016–2017)
On July 17, 2016, Faust signed with the Israeli team Ironi Nahariya for the 2016–17 season. On January 17, 2017, Faust recorded a career-high 30 points by playing only 22 minutes, shooting 10-of-16 from the field, along with six rebounds and three steals in a 101–62 blowout win over the Bakken Bears. On April 18, 2017, Faust participated in the Israeli League All-Star Game and the Slam Dunk Contest during the same event. In 57 games played for Nahariya, he averaged 10.9 points, 4.4 rebounds and 2.2 assists per game. Faust helped Nahariya reach the 2017 FIBA Europe Cup Quarterfinals as well as the 2017 Israeli League Quarterfinals, where they eventually fell short to Hapoel Jerusalem.

Orlandina (2018)
On July 13, 2017, Faust agreed to terms with the Russian team Parma Basket but eventually the deal fell through. On February 1, 2018, Faust joined the Italian team Orlandina Basket for the rest of the season. In 13 games played for Orlandina, he averaged 11 points, 4.4 rebounds and 2.1 assists per game.

Atomerőmű SE (2018–2020)
On September 1, 2018, Faust signed with the Hungarian team Atomerőmű SE for the 2018–19 season. On December 27, 2018, Faust recorded a double-double with a season-high 28 points and 11 rebounds, shooting 8-of-13 from the field, along with three assists in an 84–93 loss to Egis Körmend. In 35 games played during the 2018–19 season, he led the team in scoring (16.1) and steals (1.7), to go with 6.3 rebounds and 2.1 assists per game.

On September 24, 2019, Faust signed a one-year contract extension with Atomerőmű.

Spójnia Stargard (2020–2021)
On November 23, 2020, he has signed with Spójnia Stargard of the PLK.

Hsinchu JKO Lioneers (2021–2022)
In 2021, Faust joined the Hsinchu JKO Lioneers of the P. League+ in Taiwan.

Formosa Taishin Dreamers (2022–2023)
In 2022, Faust joined the Formosa Taishin Dreamers of the P. League+ in Taiwan.

Tainan TSG GhostHawks (2023–present)
On January 12, 2023, Faust signed with Tainan TSG GhostHawks of the T1 League. On March 6, Tainan TSG GhostHawks terminated the contract relationship with Faust.

References

External links
 RealGM profile
 Long Beach State 49ers bio

1993 births
Living people
American expatriate basketball people in Hungary
American expatriate basketball people in Israel
American expatriate basketball people in Italy
American expatriate basketball people in Poland
American men's basketball players
Atomerőmű SE players
Basketball players from Baltimore
Ironi Nahariya players
Long Beach State Beach men's basketball players
Maryland Terrapins men's basketball players
Orlandina Basket players
Shooting guards
Small forwards
American expatriate basketball people in Taiwan
Hsinchu JKO Lioneers players
P. League+ imports
Tainan TSG GhostHawks players
T1 League imports